Mon Alboum! is the debut album by French virtual singer Pinocchio, released by EMI Music France in November 2005.

The album debuted at number 38 in France, peaking at number 35 the following week.

Track listing

Charts

References 

2005 albums
Pinocchio (virtual singer) albums
EMI Music France albums